"VCR" is the fourth single by The xx, from their self-titled debut album. The single was first released in the UK on 24 January 2010. The song was also featured on the episode "Black Friday" from the television series Lie to Me. Music critic Robert Christgau named it the tenth best single of the year.

Track listing
UK iTunes single
"VCR" – 2:59
"Insects" – 2:28

UK vinyl
"VCR" – 2:59
"Insects" – 2:28

VCR (Four Tet Remix) – Single
"VCR" (Four Tet Remix) – 4:52

Digital EP
"Insects" – 2:28
"VCR" (Four Tet Remix) – 8:40
"VCR" (Matthew Dear Remix) – 4:52
"Shelter" (John Talabot Feel It Too Remix) – 6:49
"Night Time" (Greg Wilson Remix) – 8:33

Chart performance
"VCR'" entered the UK Indie Chart on 31 October 2010 at number 15; as well as the UK Singles Chart at number 132, marking the band's second most successful single behind "Islands", which peaked at number 34 in September 2010.

Release history

Cover versions
"VCR" was covered by Orchestral Manoeuvres in the Dark. Their version was published at SoundCloud on 18 November 2010 and released as a B-side to "History of Modern (Part I)" on 28 February 2011.

The Antlers released a cover of the song for their 2011 EP

References

External links
 
 

2010 singles
The xx songs
2009 songs
Young Turks (record label) singles
Songs written by Romy Madley Croft
Songs written by Oliver Sim
Songs written by Jamie xx
Songs written by Baria Qureshi